WFE may refer to:
World Federation of Exchanges
Wavefront error, see e.g. Adaptive optics
Wafer fab equipment or wafer front end (equipment) market, two descriptions of same market using same acronym
Wii Family Edition, the first revision of the Wii (released in late 2011), also called the RVL-101, that removed GameCube support